The 26th Rhythmic Gymnastics European Championships was held in Bremen, Germany from 16 to 18 April 2010.

Medal winners

Results

Seniors

Individual all-around

Group all-around

Group 5 hoops

Group 3 ribbons + 2 ropes

Juniors

Team

Rope

Hoop

Ball

Clubs

Medal count

Seniors

Juniors

References

External links
Official website
Championships Rhythmic Gymnastics Results

European Rhythmic Gymnastics Championships
Rhythmic Gymnastics European Championships
2010 in German sport
International gymnastics competitions hosted by Germany
Sport in Bremen (city)